Lipedematous alopecia is a disorder characterized by a thick boggy scalp and hair loss.

See also 
 Hot comb alopecia
 List of cutaneous conditions

References 

Conditions of the skin appendages